Jaysus (born in Friedrichshafen on 25 September 1982) is a German rapper of German and Greek origin.

Chablife
Between 2001 and 2005, Jaysus was part of the rap band Chablife that also included Kay One and Scandaliz. Kool Savas, a prominent rapper brought them to Berlin. Upon his recommendation, Chablife got signed with Royalbunker for a record label.

Solo
In 2006 he released his street album König im Süden with Shrazy Records. Juice, specializing in hip hop music chose it as "Street album of the month". He was promoted as a solo act in many rap festivals and led the names of a pan-German "Shrazy Records-Tour" as a headline act. He also helped Shindy another German rapper of Greek origin in his beginnings.

MACHT RAP label
In 2008 Jaysus parted ways with Shrazy Records and in 2009 he established his own label MACHT RAP in Stuttgart with his brother Costa. Rappers on the label included Rapsta, Big Toon and for some time Musiyelage. In March 2013, his label MACHT Rap went into a distribution agreement with Warner Music Group in all German markets.

Discography

Albums / street albums
2006: König im Süden
2007: Der erste Tag vom Rest meines Lebens
2010: Narzischwein
2011: Nenn mich Jay
2014: Gott Liebt Die Geduldigen

Singles
in Chablife
2004: "Chabo Mambo"
2004: "Ich bin ein Chabo" (Chablife feat. Eko Fresh, Manuellsen & Ramsi Aliani)
2004: "Eigentlich Schön" (Chablife feat. Eko Fresh & Azra)
Solo
2007: "Nur wegen Ihr" (feat. Israel)
2009: "Was für’n Mann"
2010: "2 gegen die Welt"
2011: "Seh ich gut aus"
2011: "Macht Rap Gang"
2011: "Ich hasse es zu lügen"
2011: "Killa Killa"

Freetracks and cooperations
(Refer to Jaysus article discography in German Wikipedia)

References

External links
MACHT TV official Youtube channel

German rappers
1982 births
Living people
People from Friedrichshafen
German people of Greek descent